Ryan Villopoto (born August 13, 1988, in Fortuna, California) is an American former professional motocross and supercross racer. He competed in the AMA Motocross Championships from 2005 to 2014.

The four-time supercross and three-time motocross champion from Poulsbo, Washington, raced his entire career for the Kawasaki factory racing team in the supercross and outdoor motocross series. His retirement from supercross was announced on January 3, 2015, on the opening day of the 2015 Monster Energy Supercross season. His trainer was Aldon Baker.

Supercross

Supercross

2010
While leading the Main of Round 14 at St. Louis, Villopoto came up short on a triple jump and leaped from his bike, landing hard. His bike dove into the face of the third jump and flipped over several times. Medical workers arrived on the scene and cut the racing boot off his foot. Villopoto had to be carried off the track. Further examination revealed a broken right tibia and fibula and surgery was performed to stabilize it. He withdrew from the 2010 series after his Round 14 injury with 266 championship points, leaving him in 4th place by the season's end.

2011
Villopoto won his first Monster Energy AMA Supercross Championship, edging out Chad Reed by four points in the 17-race championship. Villopoto won a series-high six races throughout the season.

Later he won the inaugural Monster Energy Cup, claiming wins in the three heats to grab a US$1 million purse.

He finished 2011 leading Ryan Dungey by 12 points to claim the Lucas Oil Pro Motocross Championship.

2012
Villopoto won his second AMA Supercross Championship, capturing the title with four rounds remaining in the season. He won 9 of 16 rounds of racing.

2013
Villopoto won the 2013 Monster Energy AMA Supercross Championship. It was Villopoto's third straight AMA Supercross Series championship, putting him in an elite class of off-road motorcycle champions – only Bob Hannah, Jeremy McGrath, and Ricky Carmichael have won three straight SX titles (Hannah ’77 – ’79, McGrath ”93 – ’96, ’98 – 2000, Carmichael ’01 – ’03).

He would also go on to win the Lucas oil Pro Motocross Championship.

2014
Villipoto wrapped up his 4th straight Monster Energy Supercross championship with one round remaining in the 2014 series.

On March 8, 2014, Villopoto won the 450cc Final at Daytona International Speedway.  It was his 4th career win at Daytona moving him within one win of Ricky Carmichael's all-time record of five Daytona wins.  He had previously won races in Phoenix and Oakland during the Supercross season. On April 5, 2014, Villopoto won the 450cc Main Event at Houston's Reliant Stadium, bringing his total career Supercross All-Time Wins number to 38, making him 5th place overall behind Chad Reed. On April 26, 2014 Villopoto dominated the highly competitive Supercross race at round 16 in New York, Metlife stadium, collecting his 6th win of the season (40th of career).

2015
Villopoto chose to compete in the FIM Motocross World Championship, but withdrew from the series after discovering that the injuries sustained from a crash in the Trentino GP were worse than initially realized. In July, Villopoto announced his retirement on his official website.

Stadium Super Trucks
On December 13, 2017, Villopoto announced he would compete in the Stadium Super Trucks World Championship at Lake Elsinore Diamond, driving the No. 2 RPM Off-Road truck. He finished tenth in both feature races.

Motorsports career results

Career AMA Supercross/Motocross results

Championships

2006 MX Lites Champion
2007 AMA West SX Lites Champion
2007 MX Lites Champion
2008 MX Lites Champion
2011 AMA Supercross 450 Champion
2011 AMA 450 Motocross Champion
2012 AMA Supercross 450 Champion
2013 AMA Supercross 450 Champion
2013 AMA 450 Motocross Champion
2014 AMA Supercross 450 Champion

Total Career AMA Wins

11 Wins in 125/250 AMA Supercross (Regional): 1–2006 7–2007 3–2008
20 Wins in 125/250 AMA Motocross: 6–2006 5–2007 9–2008
41 Wins in 250/450 AMA Supercross: 2–2009 7–2010 6–2011 9–2012 10–2013 7–2014
12 Wins in 250/450 AMA Motocross: 1–2009 3–2011 8–2013
73 Total AMA Wins: 6–2006 5–2007 9–2008 3–2009 7–2010 9–2011 9–2012 18–2013 7–2014
1 Win in MXGP: 1–2015

Stadium Super Trucks
(key) (Bold – Pole position. Italics – Fastest qualifier. * – Most laps led.)

References

External links
Official Website
*

1988 births
Living people
American motocross riders
Sportspeople from Washington (state)
AMA Motocross Championship National Champions
Stadium Super Trucks drivers
Menifee, California
People from Poulsbo, Washington